Stolus or Stolos, was a town of Chalcidice, in ancient Macedonia.

Stolus was a member of the Delian League; its name appears on tribute lists from 454/3 to 434/3 BCE. It is considered by some to be the same as the town called Scolus; and by others to be the same as Polichnitai.

The site of Stolus is near the modern Plana.

References

Populated places in ancient Macedonia
Former populated places in Greece
Geography of ancient Chalcidice
Members of the Delian League